Orthrias is a genus of ray-finned fish in the family Balitoridae.

Species 
 Orthrias potaninorum - 
 Orthrias sawadai - 
 Orthrias tschaiyssuensis -

Footnotes 
 
 

 
Balitoridae
Taxonomy articles created by Polbot